The 2010 Philippine Basketball Association (PBA) Fiesta Conference was the best-of-7 basketball championship series of the 2010 PBA Fiesta Conference, and the conclusion of the conference's playoffs. The Alaska Aces and the San Miguel Beermen played for the 99th championship contested by the league.

The Alaska Aces won their 13th league championship with a 4–2 series victory over the defending Fiesta Conference champions San Miguel Beermen.

Background

Road to the finals

Series summary

Game 1

Game 2

Game 3

Game 4

Game 5

Game 6

Rosters

Broadcast notes

References

External links
PBA official website

2010
2009–10 PBA season
San Miguel Beermen games
Alaska Aces (PBA) games
BA Fiesta Conference Finals